Hypoderaeum is a genus of flatworms belonging to the family Echinostomatidae.

The species of this genus are found in Europe and Northern America.

Species:

Hypoderaeum charadrii
Hypoderaeum conoideum 
Hypoderaeum cubanicum 
Hypoderaeum essexense 
Hypoderaeum gnedini 
Hypoderaeum skrjabini 
Hypoderaeum vigi

References

Platyhelminthes